Turkey Creek is a stream in the U.S. state of Georgia. It is a tributary to the Oconee River.

Turkey Creek's name is an accurate preservation of its native Creek-language name, Pennohatchee meaning "turkey stream". Former variant names were "Pennohatchee Creek" and "Pinahachi Creek".

References

Rivers of Georgia (U.S. state)
Rivers of Laurens County, Georgia
Rivers of Twiggs County, Georgia
Rivers of Wilkinson County, Georgia